Moses Moeketsi Mosuhli (born August 5, 1981, in Quthing) is a Lesotho marathon runner. He set his personal best time of 2:14:03, by finishing second at the 2008 Nedbank Durban City Marathon in Durban, South Africa.

Mosuhli represented Lesotho at the 2008 Summer Olympics in Beijing, where he competed in the men's marathon, along with his compatriots Tsotang Maine and Clement Lebopo. He did not finish the entire race, before reaching the halfway mark of the course.

References

External links

NBC 2008 Olympics profile

Lesotho male marathon runners
Living people
Olympic athletes of Lesotho
Athletes (track and field) at the 2008 Summer Olympics
1981 births
People from Quthing District